Gert Jan Maarten "Gert-Jan" Segers (born 9 July 1969) is a Dutch politician who was Leader of the Christian Union between 2015 and 2023. He has been a member of the House of Representatives since 2012 and was parliamentary leader between 2015 and 2023.

Early career
A native of Lisse, Segers studied political science at Leiden University and obtained a master's degree in Western–Islamic relations and the Middle East at Johns Hopkins University. From 2000 to 2007 he was a Christian missionary in Egypt. From 2008 to 2012, he was the chairman of the Christian Union think tank Mr. G. Groen van Prinsterer Stichting. He is also a columnist for the Dutch newspaper Nederlands Dagblad; he wrote two books criticising political Islam, as well as two novels.

Politics
Segers entered the House of Representatives following the 2012 general election. In 2015, he succeeded Arie Slob as party leader and parliamentary leader. In the 2017 general election, the Christian Union remained stable with five seats. Prime Minister Mark Rutte first turned toward GroenLinks to form his third cabinet, but policy disagreement between the parties prevented participation. Rutte then turned toward the Christian Union, who accepted the offer to govern: two Christian Union members were appointed (Carola Schouten and Arie Slob).

On 13 January 2023, Segers announced his resignation as leader of the Christian Union. He was succeeded by Mirjam Bikker on 17 January.

Private life
Gert-Jan Segers is married and has three children. Theo Segers, the former Mayor of Staphorst and current Mayor of Molenlanden, is his cousin.

References

External links
  Parlement.com biography

1969 births
Living people
21st-century Dutch male writers
21st-century Dutch novelists
21st-century Dutch politicians
Christian Union (Netherlands) politicians
Dutch Calvinist and Reformed Christians
Dutch columnists
Dutch journalists
Dutch male novelists
Dutch political scientists
Dutch Protestant missionaries
Dutch Reformed Church missionaries
Johns Hopkins University alumni
Leaders of the Christian Union (Netherlands)
Leiden University alumni
Members of the House of Representatives (Netherlands)
People from Lisse
Protestant missionaries in Egypt
Reformatory Political Federation politicians
20th-century Dutch people